El Hajeb (Arabic: الحاجب ) is a province in the Moroccan economic region of Fès-Meknès. Its population in 2004 was 216,388 

The major cities and towns are: 
 Agourai
 Ain Taoujdate
 Ait Boubidmane
 El Hajeb
 Sabaa Aiyoun
 Sebt Jahjouh

Subdivisions
The province is divided administratively into the following:

References

 
El Hajeb Province